Kerseycleugh Bridge is a small stone bridge across the River North Tyne at Kerseycleugh in Northumberland.

History
The bridge, which has one stone arch, was completed in 1853. The structure, which has a reinforced concrete base, is the first significant road bridge across the river after its source.

References

Bridges in Northumberland
Crossings of the River Tyne